The Wanyuru were an indigenous Australian people of the state of Queensland.

Name
The ethnonym is that recorded by Tindale, though the linguist Robert Dixon later affirmed that no tribal name is known for the people who spoke the Wañjurru language.

Language
Wañurr(u), together with Yidiny and Gunggay, the latter spoken by the Gungganyji, were all dialects of the one language.

Country
Like the other rainforest dwellers in this area, the Kunja, their inland extension lay about Babinda.

Alternative name
 Wanjar.

Notes

Citations

Sources

Aboriginal peoples of Queensland